Cássio Roberto Ramos (born 6 June 1987), known as Cássio, is a Brazilian professional footballer who plays as a goalkeeper for Corinthians and the Brazil national team. He is widely considered to be one of the greatest Corinthians goalkeepers of all time. 

Cássio began his career at the academy of Brazilian club Grêmio, and in shortly time playing at the academy, was promoted to the club's main team. He passed by the European clubs PSV where he won the 2007–08 Eredivisie title and the 2008 Johan Cruyff Shield title, and by the club Sparta Rotterdam, until he joined the Brazilian team Corinthians in 2012.

Since joining Corinthians, Cássio has made over 500 appearances and won two Série A titles, four Campeonato Paulista titles, a CONMEBOL Libertadores title, a CONMEBOL Recopa Sudamericana title and a FIFA Club World Cup title against Chelsea in 2012. Cássio won the Golden Ball as Best Player of the 2012 FIFA Club World Cup and was elected as Most Valuable Player of the final. After the triumph of 2019 Campeonato Paulista, he became the player with most titles in club's history.

At international level, Cássio has represented the Brazil national team, making his debut in 2017, and was part of the squads that took part in the 2018 FIFA World Cup and that won the 2019 Copa América.

Club career

Grêmio
Born in Veranópolis, Rio Grande do Sul, Cássio was a Grêmio youth graduate. He made his first team debut on 12 February 2006, in a 2–1 Campeonato Gaúcho home win over Santa Cruz-RS.

Cássio made his Série A debut on 26 October 2006, replacing injured Rodrigo Galatto in a 2–1 away success over Fluminense. He spent the remainder of his spell at the club as a third-choice behind Marcelo Grohe and Galatto, both also youth graduates at the club.

PSV Eindhoven

He started his first game for PSV in January 2009. Soon after, the 21-year-old former Brazilian U-20 national squad goalkeeper moved to Sparta Rotterdam until the end of the season. In the 2011–12 season he played at the second team. On 28 September 2011 his contract was terminated by mutual consent and Cássio returned to Brazil.

Corinthians
In the end of 2011, after terminating his contract with PSV Eindhoven, Cássio signed with Corinthians. On 27 April 2012, he was made Corinthians' first-choice goalkeeper, replacing Júlio César, the former number one goalkeeper at the club. He made his debut in the Libertadores 2012 on 2 May 2012, in a game against Emelec in the round-of-16. The result was a goalless draw and Cássio was elected Man of the Match following a great display. He went on to make 7 more appearances for Corinthians in the competition, helping the team become champions, including a miraculous save against Vasco da Gama in the second-leg of the quarter-finals. On 16 December 2012, Cássio helped Corinthians beat Chelsea by the score of 1–0 in the FIFA Club World Cup. He was later rewarded the golden ball for the tournament due to his brilliant performances during the competition.

International career

He has been capped at Under-20 level for Brazil and played for the U-20 World Cup in Canada.

The first call came in 2007 by Dunga for two friendly matches against Chile and Ghana. He was 19 years old and was called up due to Helton's injury; and also because Dunga was calling some players under the Olympic age to prepare for the 2008 Summer Olympics. Eventually he did make it to the preliminary squad for the Beijing Games, but lost out a place in the final list to Renan and Diego Alves.

In August 2012, Cássio was called up by Mano Menezes for two friendlies against South Africa and China.

He was called up by Brazil coach Dunga in 2015 for two games of 2018 FIFA World Cup qualification and was called up again three times by Tite in the second semester of 2017 for four consecutive games of the 2018 FIFA World Cup qualification and two friendlies. He was given his first cap with the top eleven team on 10 November 2017, coming in as a substitute for Alisson for the second half of the friendly against Japan. His participation was minimal due to Japan's limited attempts on goal, but he ended up conceding two goals from Makino and Sugimoto, though the latter's was nullified.

In May 2018 he was named in Tite’s final 23 man squad for the 2018 FIFA World Cup in Russia. He also was part of the 2019 Copa América's winning squad.

Career statistics

Club

International

Honours

PSV
Eredivisie: 2007–08
Johan Cruyff Shield: 2008

Corinthians
Campeonato Brasileiro Série A: 2015, 2017
Copa Libertadores: 2012
FIFA Club World Cup: 2012
Recopa Sudamericana: 2013
Campeonato Paulista: 2013, 2017, 2018, 2019

Brazil
Superclásico de las Américas: 2012
Copa América: 2019

Individual
FIFA Club World Cup Golden Ball: 2012
Campeonato Brasileiro Série A Team of the Year: 2015
Campeonato Paulista Team of the Year: 2019 
Campeonato Paulista Team of the Year: 2020
Bola de Prata: 2022

References

External links

1987 births
Living people
Brazilian footballers
Brazil youth international footballers
Brazil under-20 international footballers
Brazil international footballers
Association football goalkeepers
Grêmio Foot-Ball Porto Alegrense players
PSV Eindhoven players
Sparta Rotterdam players
Sport Club Corinthians Paulista players
Eredivisie players
Campeonato Brasileiro Série A players
Brazilian expatriate footballers
Expatriate footballers in the Netherlands
Brazilian expatriate sportspeople in the Netherlands
Sportspeople from Rio Grande do Sul
2018 FIFA World Cup players
2019 Copa América players
Copa América-winning players
Copa Libertadores-winning players